Jimmy Oliver may refer to:

Jimmy Oliver (basketball) (born 1969), American basketball player
Jimmy Oliver (Canadian football) (born 1973), Canadian football player
Jimmy Oliver (musician) (1920–2005), American musician

See also
James Oliver (disambiguation)